Centrodera is the genus of the Lepturinae subfamily in long-horned beetle family. Beetles of this genus are distributed in North America, most of them are found only in United States.

Species list
Genus include:
 Centrodera autumnata Leech, 1963
 Centrodera dayi Leech, 1963
 Centrodera decolorata (Harris, 1841)
 Centrodera minima Linsley & Chemsak, 1972
 Centrodera nevadica LeConte, 1873
 Centrodera oculata Casey, 1913
 Centrodera osburni Knull, 1947
 Centrodera quadrimaculata (Champlain & Knull, 1922)
 Centrodera spurca (LeConte, 1857)
 Centrodera sublineata LeConte, 1862
 Centrodera tenera Casey, 1913

References

Lepturinae